The decade of the 1230s in art involved some significant events.

Events
 1239: First record of Mabel of Bury St. Edmunds, English embroiderer.

Paintings

 1238: Wuzhun Shifan – Self-portrait
 1237: Yahya ibn Mahmud al-Wasiti – Maqamat (meetings) of the al-Hariri
 1235: Bonaventura Berlinghieri – St. Francis

Births
 1239: Gaddo Gaddi, Florentine painter and mosaicist in a gothic art style (died 1312)
 1238: Guglielmo Agnelli, Pisan-born sculptor and architect (died 1313)
 1235: Qián Xuǎn, Chinese loyalist painter from Zhejiang during the Southern Song dynasty (died 1305)
 1235: Chen Rong, Chinese painter during the Southern Song dynasty (died 1262)

Deaths
 1235: Cosimo Cosmati, Roman architect, sculptor and worker in decorative geometric mosaic (born 1210)
 1230: Benedetto Antelami, Italian architect and sculptor of the Romanesque school (born 1150)

References

 
Years of the 13th century in art
Art